Thomas H. Woods (March 17, 1836 - August 10, 1910) was a Mississippi lawyer and legislator who served as  Chief Justice of the Mississippi Supreme Court.

Woods attended the public schools there, and later attended two sessions at Williams College in Massachusetts. After returning to Mississippi, he read law and obtained his license to practice, settling in Kemper County. He was sent as a delegate to the convention which passed the ordinance of secession, of which body he was the youngest member.

He served in the Confederate States Army and served as the Captain of Co. C, 13th Mississippi Regiment Infantry, receiving a serious wound at Malvern Hill. After the war he was an attorney, and in 1865 was elected District Attorney, reelected in 1866 and again in 1875. He resigned in 1876, and was elected to the Mississippi State Legislature in 1882. In 1889, he was appointed to the Mississippi Supreme Court, in which he served as the chief justice. He also served as the first president of Citizens National Bank, also known as Citizens Savings Bank which was started in 1888.

References

Sources
 Publication #51 Rose Hill Cemetery Interment Records; page 246; by Bill and Mary East; Published by Lauderdale County Department of Archives & History, Inc.
 The Meridian Star; May 1, 1938; Page 11; Article "From a Small Start to Federal Agency"

Confederate States Army officers
District attorneys in Mississippi
1910 deaths
Chief Justices of the Mississippi Supreme Court
1836 births
American bank presidents
People from Glasgow, Kentucky
U.S. state supreme court judges admitted to the practice of law by reading law
19th-century American judges
19th-century American businesspeople